"Hot Temptation" is a song by German pop group Bro'Sis. It was written by Douglas Carr and Christian Waltz and produced by Axel Breitung for the Special Winter Edition reissue of the band's debut studio album Never Forget (Where You Come From) (2002). Released on 21 October 2002 as the re-release's first single, the previously unreleased song reached number 11 on the Austrian Singles Chart and became another top five hit for the band in Germany.

Formats and track listings

Credits and personnel

 Ross Antony – vocals
 Axel Breitung – production
 Hila Bronstein – vocals
 Shaham Joyce – vocals

 Faiz Mangat – vocals
 Indira Weis – vocals
 Giovanni Zarrella – vocals

Charts

Weekly charts

Year-end charts

References

2002 songs
Bro'Sis songs
Polydor Records singles
Songs written by Christian Walz